Tim Flavin (born January 13, 1959) is an American actor. Flavin was the first American to be presented with a Laurence Olivier Award, for his 1984 performance in Rodgers and Hart's On Your Toes at the Palace Theatre in London's West End.

Early life and education 
Flavin was born in Houston in 1959. He graduated from the Kinder High School for the Performing and Visual Arts and earned a certificate in education from the Manchester College of Arts and Technology in 2016.

Career
Flavin has performed extensively on Broadway, West End, film, television, and as a voice artist for almost forty years. His theatre career prompted one critic to say, "When God created musicals, it was because he knew that Tim Flavin would come along."

From 2013 to 2021, Flavin worked as the director of musical theatre at the Arden School of Theatre. He also taught and directed at the Guildford School of Acting, London School of Musical Theatre, and the BRIT School. In 2021, Flavin joined Autistry Studios in San Rafael, California, as a mentor.

Filmography

Film

Television

References

External links

External links
 

1959 births
Living people
American male stage actors

People from Houston
Actors from Houston
Actors from Texas
Male actors from Texas
American musical theatre directors
American musical theatre actors